Tetramethoxyamphetamine, or 2,3,4,5-tetramethoxyamphetamine, is a lesser-known psychedelic drug and a substituted amphetamine. Tetramethoxyamphetamine was first synthesized by Alexander Shulgin. In his book PiHKAL (Phenethylamines i Have Known And Loved), the minimum dosage is listed as 50 mg, and the duration unknown. Tetramethoxyamphetamine produces a threshold, mydriasis, and a headache. Limited data exists about its pharmacological properties, metabolism, and toxicity.

References

External links 
 Tetramethoxyamphetamine entry in PiHKAL
 Tetramethoxyamphetamine entry in PiHKAL • info

Substituted amphetamines
Methoxy compounds